The 1921 Haskell Indians football team was an American football team that represented the Haskell Institute (later renamed Haskell Indian Nations University) as an independent during the 1921 college football season.  In its second and final season under head coach Matty Bell, the team compiled a 5–4 record.

Schedule

References

Haskell
Haskell Indian Nations Fighting Indians football seasons
Haskell Indians football